Meli may refer to:

People with the surname
 Angelo Meli (1897–1969), American mobster
 Francis Meli (born 1979), New Zealand rugby league player
 Giovanni Meli (1740–1815), Italian poet
 Mangi Meli, Tanzanian royalty

People with the given name 
 Meli Bogileka, Fijian politician

Other uses
 Methyllithium, organolithium compound
Amomyrtus meli, a species of tree
 Meli Park, a former theme park in Belgium
 Mercado Libre, Argentine e-commerce company (stock symbol MELI)

See also
Melih, a Turkish given name
Melis, a surname and given name
Mellis (disambiguation)